This is a list of electoral results for the electoral district of Wangaratta in Victorian state elections.

Members of Wangaratta
John Bowser was member for Wangaratta and Rutherglen until the 1904 election.

Election results

Elections in the 1920s

 John Bowser was the sitting Nationalist MP for Wangaratta, but changed to the Victorian Farmers Union before this election.

Elections in the 1910s

References

Victoria (Australia) state electoral results by district